Rugby union in India is a minor sport. However, it is a fast-growing sport as some Indian sporting clubs are beginning to embrace the game. Rugby union is the second most popular winter sport after association football in India, which itself trails greatly in popularity to cricket.

India is World Rugby Rankings rated 77th in the rugby playing nations as of May 2016. The IRFU has 24,010 registered players, 7,160 of whom are female. This is their highest ranking ever. India is the current Division 3 South-Central title holder in the Asia Rugby Championship.

The governing body is Rugby India.

History

Prehistory
India, like many other countries, had a few forms of folk football. Most of these have died out, but a Manipuri game, yubi lakpi is still played in the East of India.  Emma Levine, an English writer on little-known Asian sports, speculates:

"Perhaps this was the root of modern rugby? Most Manipuris are quite adamant that the modern world 'stole' the idea from them and made it into rugby... this game, which has been around for centuries, is so similar to rugby, which evolved a great deal later, that it must be more than a coincidence."

However, traditional football games can be found in many parts of the world, e.g. marn grook in Australia, cuju in China and calcio Fiorentino in Italy and Levine provides no documentary or material evidence of its antiquity.

British India
Like other sports founded in England and brought to India during the British Rule such as cricket, rugby union has a long history in India. The earliest trace of Rugby Football in India dates back to a scratch match or two played in Calcutta and Madras during the visit of H.M.S. Galatea in 1871. The teak goal posts used on the occasion of the Calcutta Match were afterward used by the C.F.C. up to at least 1886.

The first recorded match was played on Christmas Day 1872, at CFC in Calcutta, it was played between England and a combined team of Scotland, Ireland and Wales. The game caught on and had to be repeated within the week.

The game was now established. In January 1873, officers were appointed and the Club Rolls gave a total of 137 members. The Club colours were chosen as red and white, broad stripes.

From then on, rugby in India, lingered on at a very low key. Part of the reason for this was that the British preferred to play apart from their colonial subjects, leading to a low take up by the local population. Another reason was the climate, which meant that games would frequently have to be played in the evenings or early morning, which meant that it was not too popular with the colonists themselves.

20th and 21st Centuries
At its lowest ebb, in the 1980s, the Indian RFU was being run out of the Irish Consulate at the Royal Bombay Yacht Club's chambers. However, a fairly successful campaign in the 1990s put the game back on its feet.

Indian delegates were amongst those who went to the centenary congress of the International Rugby Football Board in 1986.

There are 57,000 registered players in the country and India are ranked 65th out of 96 nations in the IRB (International Rugby Board) world rankings. The home of rugby in India is considered to be Kolkata.

Calcutta Cup

On Christmas Day 1872, a game of rugby, between 20 players representing England on the one side and 20 representing Scotland, Ireland and Wales on the other, was played in Calcutta.

The match was such a success that it was repeated a week later — the game of rugby had reached India. These lovers of rugby wanted to form a club in the area and the aforementioned matches were the agents which led to the formation of the Calcutta Football Club in January 1873.

The Calcutta Club joined the Rugby Football Union in 1874. Despite the Indian climate not being entirely suitable for playing rugby, the club prospered during that first year. However, when the free bar had to be discontinued, the membership took an appreciable drop. Other sports, such as tennis and polo, which were considered to be more suited to the local climate, were making inroads into the numbers of players available.

In 1877 the game declined and almost died out, leaving behind a full coffer. The wise G.A.J. Rothney, who had been acting as Captain, Hon. Secretary and Treasurer of the Club at that time, proposed that the funds should be devoted to the purchase of a cup of Indian workmanship to be offered to the Rugby Football Union- the parent body of the game worldwide. The withdrawal of these monies was done in the form of silver coins which were then melted to craft the exquisite Calcutta Cup.

The members decided to disband but keen to perpetuate the name of the club, they withdrew the club's funds from the bank; which were in Silver Rupees, had them melted down and made into a cup which they presented to the RFU in 1878, with the provision that it should be competed for annually.

The cup is of Indian workmanship, approximately 18 inches (45 cm) high, the body is finely engraved with three king cobras forming the handles. The domed lid is surmounted by an elephant which is, it is said, copied from the Viceroy's own stock and is complete with a howdah. The inscription on the Cup's wooden base reads: THE CALCUTTA CUP.

This historical legacy has not been universally well-received, in fact, Sean Smith, whose book The Union Game: A Rugby History accompanied the BBC TV series of the same name, has said of it that:
"It speaks volumes for the traditions of class prejudice in England and Scotland that the two countries play each year for a trophy made in the Raj."

The other Calcutta Cup 
In 1884 Calcutta Cricket and Football Club (CC&FC) again set up a rugby section and in 1890 set up an inter club trophy, the Calcutta Rugby Union Challenge Cup, promptly christened the Calcutta Cup.

The cup is held by Jungle Crows who beat CC&FC. The second division trophy was won by Calcutta Cricket and Football Club Panthers.

All India and South Asia Rugby Tournament

The All India and South Asia Rugby Tournament is an amateur league competition for rugby union football clubs in India. The competition has been played since 1924. In 2016 12 team took part in the tournament and Army Red were the champions. For the first time women will be participating in the Rugby XVs, there were 6 teams.

2010 Commonwealth Games - Delhi, India 

India is an active participant in the Commonwealth Sevens, and the 2010 Commonwealth Games, held in Delhi featured the sport.

National teams

In June 2019, the Indian women's registered their first victory in only their third-ever international match, when they defeated Singapore in the 2019 Asia Rugby Women's Championship. Team member Sweety Kumari, who was in excellent form during the tournament was declared as the 'International Young Player Of The Year' by Scrumqueens magazine.

See also
Indian Rugby Football Union
 India national rugby union team
 India national rugby union team (sevens)
 India women's national rugby sevens team
Bangalore rugby football club
Iain Laughland
Maurice McCanlis
Arthur Turner
Rahul Bose
Sport in India

External links 
 IRB India page
 Indian Rugby Football Union
 India rugby
 Rugby in Asia India Homepage
 "Islam and Rugby" on the Rugby Readers review
 Archives du Rugby: Inde
 Indian rugby has capacity to inspire

References 

 
 Levine, Emma A Game of Polo with a Headless Goat
 Richards, Huw A Game for Hooligans: The History of Rugby Union (Mainstream Publishing, Edinburgh, 2007)
 Smith, Sean The Union Game: A Rugby History
 Starmer-Smith, Nigel (ed) Rugby - A Way of Life, An Illustrated History of Rugby (Lennard Books, 1986 )